Jersey Live Music Festival (alternatively Jersey Live) was a music festival held annually at The Royal Jersey Showground in the parish of Trinity, Jersey between 2004 and 2016.

Overview
Jersey Live started out as a 4,000-capacity, one-day event in 2004 with music across two stages. The festival took place over two days and grew in size each year, with six stages featuring live music, DJs and as of 2013, comedy and spoken word. Jersey Live had capacity for an attendance of 10,000 people per day, selling out at that capacity for the first time in 2010.

The festival was sponsored each year by local telecommunications company JT, who host the JT Stage at the festival. The other five stages are the Main Stage, Dance Stage, Family Field Stage, Hospitality Stage and Full Flow Locale DJ Tent. The festival had featured performances from a number of major stars of indie and dance music since 2004 including Paul Weller, The Prodigy, Kasabian, Dizzee Rascal and Chase & Status. The festival's line up was typically composed of established mainstream indie and dance acts on the Main and Dance stages, with up-and-coming artists of a wide range of genres spanning folk, hip-hop, punk, ska and reggae, as well as a number of local acts, making up the lineup elsewhere at the festival. Amongst the artists to have performed at Jersey Live in the early stages of their careers before going on to become considerably higher in profile, are Foals, Tinie Tempah, Jake Bugg, Ed Sheeran and Razorlight.

Stages
Since 2009, the festival typically had the following stages;
Main stage
Dance stage
Family Field stage
Hospitality stage – entry restricted to specific ticket types.
JT stage
Fullflow Locale DJ stage

2014
A festival was held on the weekend of 30 August and 31 August 2014.

2013
A festival was held on the weekend of 31 August and 1 September 2013. For the first time, the festival was granted permission to provide a campsite. However, the provision of camping was cancelled by the festival organisers due to a lack of demand.

2012
The festival was held on 1 and 2 September 2012.

The table below lists the acts that performed.

In May, Trinity's Constable John Gallichan declared that festival goers below the age of 16 would have to be accompanied by an adult, at the 2012 event, as measure to reduce underage drinking.

2011

The 2011 festival was held on 3 and 4 September 2011, and sponsored by Jersey Telecom.

The attendance was 10,000 per day.

There were disputed reports of excessive drinking by under-age people.

2010

Jersey Telecom renewed their sponsorship agreement of Jersey Live for a fifth year.

Main Stage hosted by Mani (Stone Roses/Primal Scream).

2009

Around 9,000 people attended in 2009.

2008

2007

2006

In 2006, 7,500 people attended the festival.

2005

2004

See also
Jersey Folklore Festival
Music of the Channel Islands

References

External links

Festivals in Jersey
Music festivals in Europe
Trinity, Jersey
2004 establishments in Jersey
Annual events in Jersey
Music festivals established in 2004
Music festivals in Jersey
Indie rock festivals
Rock festivals in Jersey